Fabian Kunze (born 14 June 1998) is a German professional footballer who plays as a midfielder for Hannover 96.

Personal life
He is the twin brother of fellow professional footballer Lukas Kunze, who plays in the 3. Liga for VfL Osnabrück.

References

Living people
1998 births
Association football midfielders
German footballers
FC Schalke 04 players
SV Rödinghausen players
Arminia Bielefeld players
Hannover 96 players
Bundesliga players
2. Bundesliga players
Regionalliga players
Sportspeople from Bielefeld
Footballers from North Rhine-Westphalia